The Polar Security Cutter Program is a program to recapitalize the United States Coast Guard's aging fleet of icebreakers, currently consisting of the heavy icebreaker USCGC Polar Star and the medium icebreaker USCGC Healy, with three new multi-mission vessels referred to as Polar Security Cutters (PSC). These heavy polar icebreakers will allow the USCG to perform its statutory missions in the Arctic as well as support the United States Antarctic Program with Operation Deep Freeze.

The PSC program is managed by the USCG and United States Navy through an integrated program office. On 23 April 2019, Halter Marine Inc was awarded the contract for the detail design and construction of the lead PSC. The contract option for the second PSC was exercised on 30 December 2021. The first vessel is expected to enter service in 2025 and will be named USCGC Polar Sentinel.

In the future, the PSCs will be followed by the acquisition of three medium icebreakers referred to as Arctic Security Cutters (ASC).

Project timeline

In 2010, the High Latitude Mission Analysis Report identified a need for at least six new polar icebreakers, three of which must be what the USCG refers to as "heavy icebreakers". In the same year, the USCG's only operational heavy icebreaker at the time, USCGC Polar Sea, was sidelined following engine failure.

In 2012, the USCG launched a heavy polar icebreaker acquisition program and, in 2016, established an integrated program office with the US Navy to utilize the Navy's shipbuilding expertise for acquiring the new icebreakers.

In February 2017, the USCG awarded five fixed-price contracts for heavy polar icebreaker design studies to Bollinger Shipyards, Italy's Fincantieri Marine Group, National Steel and Shipbuilding Company, Huntington Ingalls Industries, and Singapore's Halter Marine Inc .

In addition to developing heavy polar icebreaker designs with associated cost and schedule figures, the goal of these industry studies was to identify design and system approaches to reduce acquisition costs and accelerate production timelines.

In April 2017, a draft system specification as part of a request for information (RFI) in which the USCG sought questions, comments and feedback related to technology risks, sustainability, producibility, and affordability of heavy polar icebreakers. A draft request for proposal (RFP) was released in October 2017, followed by the official request for proposal for the advance procurement and detail design for a heavy polar icebreaker with options for detail design and construction for up to three vessels in March 2018.

In September 2018, the Coast Guard announced that the icebreakers would be called "Polar Security Cutters", that they would have the designation WMSP, and that the Coast Guard wanted the icebreakers to be capable of carrying deck-mounted weapons if needed. The vessels will be homeported in Seattle, Washington.

On 23 April 2019, the $745.9 million contract for the detail design and construction of the lead PSC was won by Halter Marine. The contract also included options for the construction of two additional PSCs that, if exercised, would bring the total acquisition cost to $1.9 billion excluding government-furnished equipment. Halter Marine, one of the shipyards that had previously participated in the heavy polar icebreaker industry studies, reportedly beat out competing bids from at least Fincantieri Marine Group and Bollinger Shipyards. In its press release on 7 May 2019, Halter Marine stated that it had teamed with Technology Associates, Inc. (TAI) and based its PSC design on the proposed German polar research vessel Polarstern II. Other companies involved included ABB and Trident Maritime Systems for propulsion system, Raytheon for command and control systems integration, Caterpillar for main engines, Jamestown Metal Marine for joiner package, and Bronswerk for the HVAC system.

On 30 December 2021, the USCG exercised the $552.6 million option for the construction of the second PSC.

Initially, Halter Marine anticipated that the lead ship would be delivered in summer 2024, with the second PSC in 2025, and the third vessel in late 2027. However,  the lead ship has been delayed to 2025.

In November 2022, Bollinger Shipyards announced that it would buy VT Halter Marine and oversee the construction of the Polar Security Cutters. On November 22, 2022, Bollinger Shipyards announced it had completed the acquisition of VT Halter Marine and ST Engineer Halter Marine Offshore. Construction of the Polar Security Cutters will still be completed in Pascagoula, MS at what will be called Bollinger Mississippi Shipbuilding.

Design

The Polar Security Cutters will be the largest icebreakers ever commissioned by the United States Coast Guard and the largest coast guard vessel in the world. The general design is reportedly based on the proposed German polar research vessel Polarstern II which has been modified and adapted to USCG requirements such as long open water transit from its home port to Antarctica. The PCSs will have accommodation for up to 186 crew, scientists and other personnel, and endurance time of 90 days.

The vessels' main diesel generators will be supplied by Caterpillar and the propulsion system consisting of  two Azipod propulsion units and a third fixed shaft line by ABB and Trident Maritime Systems. Designed according to the International Association of Classification Societies (IACS) Unified Requirements for Polar Class Ships, the PCSs will be strengthened to Polar Class 2 which is intended for vessels operating year-round in moderate multi-year ice conditions.

The PSCs will feature a combat system derived from the Aegis Combat System. The vessels have been said to include "space, weight, and electrical power set aside to carry offensive weapons".

Ship list

Notes

References

United States Coast Guard
Icebreakers of the United States Coast Guard